BATX is an acronym standing for Baidu, Alibaba, Tencent, and Xiaomi, the four biggest tech firms in China, often compared to GAMA (Google, Amazon, Meta (Facebook), Apple) in the United States. BATX were some of the first tech companies started in the 2000s during the rise of the Chinese technology revolution and quickly became widely used among Chinese netizens. Notably after 2015, some other tech companies like Huawei, DiDi, JD, DJI and ByteDance have also become some of the up-and-coming biggest tech giants in the industry.

List

History 
In 2000, under Chairman Jiang Zemin's instruction, China started the Golden Shield Project to manage the media and information flow within the China. The Golden Shield Project controls China's internet content to block the influence of Western media as well as implement surveillance over Chinese netizens online activities. Under the Golden Shield Project, many foreign tech companies such as Google, Facebook, Netflix, and the like were denied access into China from the Great Firewall, the main method of internet censorship in China. At the same time, the population of Chinese netizens grew substantially since the introduction of internet in 1994. By 2018, China contains a population of 800 million netizens, 98% of whom are mobile users. Many Chinese tech companies flourished under this system, without competition from foreign businesses. BATX are a few of the earliest tech companies who saw the chance and began to occupy the internet market in the early ages of China's internet transformation.

Influences

Baidu 

Baidu Search is the most popular search engine in China. Baidu is often contrasted with Google, which is the biggest search engine company founded in United States. Google is banned in China. So Baidu provides an equivalent search experience for China's netizens. Other than Baidu Search, Baidu also provides many different other products, such as Baidu Maps, Baidu Cloud, Baidu Tieba, Baidu Knows, and more, catered to different needs for Chinese netizens. Baidu accounts for 64.55% of the search engine market share in China, and also is the third biggest search engine website in the world.

Alibaba 

The Alibaba Group was first started as an e-commerce company in 1999 in Hangzhou, China. Since then, it has become a giant tech corporation, including branches like e-commerce, entertainment, online payment, cloud-computing, and AI technology. Its most famous C2C products are Taobao and Alipay, which are closely incorporated into every Chinese online shopping experience. In 2017, Taobao.com was the third most visited website in China after Baidu.com and QQ.com. Taobao accounted for 58.2% of the e-commerce market share in China by 2018.

Tencent 

Tencent was first started by Ma Huateng as a social network platform. Most Chinese netizens came to know Tencent through its messaging platform QQ. Now, Tencent has developed many more areas of business, including social platform, entertainment, e-commerce, online payment, information services, and artificial intelligence. WeChat, one of the most famous messaging apps from Tencent, had 169.6 million active monthly users in 2018. WeChat is the third most commonly used messaging app worldwide in 2018, after WhatsApp and Messenger. Tencent Entertainment is also the No.1 in the online gaming industry in the world by 2018, followed directly by Sony.

Xiaomi 

Xiaomi, in contrast to the other three, focuses more on hardware technology like smartphones, home automation, smart TVs and other smart devices. Two thirds of Xiaomi's profit is generated by smartphone sales. Xiaomi became the biggest smart phone maker in China in 2014 before plummeting down to fifth place in 2016.

Other tech companies in China 
Although BATX has been a very popular acronym for people when referring to the biggest Chinese tech firms, there are also many other tech firms has picked up after 2010 and also became the leaders in their respective fields. On Forbes' 2019 Global 2000, 20 out of 184 tech companies on the list are from China.

Huawei 

Huawei became one of the most well known Chinese tech companies in the world by the 2010s. Founded by Ren Zhengfei at 1987 at Shenzhen China, it focuses on information and communications technology (ICT) infrastructure and smart devices. Huawei became the No.1 at Telecommunication network in the world by 2012 and launched its first 5G smartphone, Mate 20 X 5G in July 2019. In 2018, Huawei generated revenue of 721,202 mm RMB of revenue, which is approximately 101,910.32 mm dollars.

DiDi 

DiDi Chuxing is the most popular taxi hailing service app in China. In 2018, there were over 30 million rides being used on DiDi each day. DiDi is available in more than 400 cities in China and has over 550 million users. DiDi accounted for 71.4% of the taxi hailing service share in China in 2018.

DJI 

DJI is a private Shenzhen-based technology firm which is the leading consumer and industrial unmanned aerial vehicles (drones) manufacturer today, holding a 76% market share worldwide as of August 2021. Their products are sold worldwide and include the Phantom and Mavic camera drone series, the Osmo camera and gimbal series, the DJI FPV series of first person racing drones, the Ronin series of camera gimbals, as well as the RoboMaster series of educational robots.

See also
Big Tech

References

Technology companies of China
Anti-corporate activism